The 2021–22 Jacksonville Dolphins men's basketball team represented Jacksonville University in the 2021–22 NCAA Division I men's basketball season. The Dolphins, led by 1st-year head coach Jordan Mincy, played their home games at Swisher Gymnasium on the university's Jacksonville, Florida campus as members of the East Division of the ASUN Conference.

Previous season
In a season limited due to the ongoing COVID-19 pandemic, the Dolphins finished the 2020–21 season 11–13, 5–9 in ASUN play to finish in eighth place. They did not compete in the ASUN tournament due to COVID-19 protocols.

Roster

Schedule and results

|-
!colspan=12 style=| Non-conference regular season

|-
!colspan=12 style=| ASUN Conference regular season

|-
!colspan=12 style=| ASUN tournament
|-

Source

References

Jacksonville Dolphins men's basketball seasons
Jacksonville Dolphins
Jacksonville Dolphins men's basketball
Jacksonville Dolphins men's basketball